Galate Samsara is a 1977 Indian Kannada language comedy film directed by C. V. Rajendran and produced by C. Jayaram. It stars Dr.Vishnuvardhan, Rajinikanth and Manjula in the lead roles. It also stars Dwarakish, Dr. K S Ashwath, Balakrishna and Vajramuni in supporting roles. The movie is a remake of Tamil movie Veettuku Veedu which was based on the play Thikku Theriyatha Veettil which in turn was an adaptation of the English comedy play Right Bed Wrong Husband. The Marathi adaptation of the same English play titled Pati Sagle Uchapati was adapted into a Kannada titled Housefull. Further, the Marathi play was also adapted in Hindi as All The Best which was remade in Malayalam as Best of Luck which in turn went on to be remade in Kannada as Ond Chance Kodi.

Plot 
Vasudevan (Dr.Vishnuvardhan) is rich businessman Kadikalingam's son. Vasu is fearful of his father, because Kadikalingam is a very strict man. He works at his father's company as General Manager. He is in love with a young bold woman Malathy. But Kadikalingam strictly opposes this love, so Vasu leaves his home and registers for marriage to Malathy. The couple is tenant to Kala's house. She is Malathy's close friend and her husband is Balu (Rajinikanth). He has a close relationship with another woman Prameela, who is a stage dancer. Kala feels unhappy about her married life. Balu has been avoiding Kala lately since his infidelity with Prameela. Balu is physically abusive towards his wife. Malathy warns Balu to stay away from Prameela and to be sincere to his wife. Balu signs the divorce papers and leaves his wife and starts staying at his girlfriends house.

Meanwhile, Balu's paternal uncle died in an accident and had named him as the next in kin in the will. They intend laying their hand on 2 lakhs cash. In a moment of crisis, Malathy is forced to make her husband Vasu pose as Kala's husband Balu. Pattusamy is manager Paramanandham's son, who works as a music teacher. Pattusamy and Paramanandham come to Kala's house and spend a week with her at her home. Pattusamy falls in love with Malathy. He tries to impress her. Pattusamy is always standing in front of Malathy's room watching her.

Prameela finds a richer businessman than Balu and kicks him out. Balu who sees Vasu and Kala's photo published in a newspaper for a soap company advertisement, goes home and argues with Vasu and Malathy. Then Malathy briefly explains the house's situation. Balu claims to hear the truth and also joins the drama.

Next day, Balu introduces himself to Paramanandham as Ramesh, Malathy's brother from Sri Lanka. Pattusamy closely watches the house and the peoples' activities because he thinks there is something fishy with the members of the house. He tells his suspicion to his father, but Paramandham does not believe his son. Unfortunately, Kadigalingam reaches Vasu's rented house and calls Kala for our home. Then, Kala and Malathy was explained the truth and Kadikalingam understood Malathy is his daughter-in-law's and mistress of Vasu. Pattusamy and his father hear the news. They are explained the crisis situation and then Paramandham gives the cash into Kala and Balu's hands. Finally Malathy succeeds in her plan and Pattusamy was asked to apologize to Malathy.

Cast 
Dr. Vishnuvardhan as Vasudev Rao
Manjula as Janaki - Janu
Rajinikanth as Balu
Shubha as Kaveri
 Halam
 Baby Rekha as Prameela
 Balakrishna
 Dwarakish
 K. S. Ashwath
 Vajramuni

Soundtrack

References

External links 

1970s Kannada-language films
1977 films
Films scored by G. K. Venkatesh
Indian comedy-drama films
Kannada remakes of Tamil films
Films directed by C. V. Rajendran
1977 comedy films